The Mosque-Madrasa of Al-Asifyah is a complex of mosque and madrasa located near the riverbank of Tigris, in Baghdad, Iraq. The mosque and its associated complex including school buildings, old courts and other former government buildings, and a palace are contained within a  site alongside the banks of the Tigris that form part of a tentative UNESCO World Heritage Site.

The mosque complex also includes a small shrine, which is believed to entomb the remains of Al-Kulayni.

History
The complex was originally consisted of a mosque, tekyeh and khan, and called Mawla Khana Tekeyyiah. Later the building belonged to the original complex was eroded and had to be demolished. The complex was then taken over by one of the students of the tekyeh who belonged to the Sufi tariqa, until the building was renovated by Muhammad Jalabi Khatib Al-Diwani in 1596. It then became the facility of Mustansiriya Madrasah. The building was renovated again by the Wali of Baghdad Wazir Dawud Pasha in 1825. During the time, two madrasas were built for elementary and secondary levels, attached with preaching area and a minaret. He also reformed the mosque with larger prayer space, and erected two minarets to the south of the mosque made of stone and decorated with Qashani tiles. The buildings were engraved with the poetry by Sheikh Saleh Al-Tamimi.

Burials 
• Muhammad ibn Ya'qub Ishaq Al-Kulayni, a notable Shi'ite Muslim scholar.

See also

 Islam in Iraq
 List of mosques in Iraq

References

16th-century mosques
Madrasas in Iraq
Mosques in Baghdad
Ottoman mosques in Iraq